Amana Contracting and Steel Buildings is a UAE based industrial and commercial design-build construction company.  It specializes in fast-track, turnkey construction of commercial, industrial and institutional low-rise facilities.

Offices 

Founded in Abu Dhabi in 1993, Amana Contracting and Steel Buildings now runs its operations through various offices in the United Arab Emirates, Qatar and Saudi Arabia.

Projects 

Over the years, Amana Contracting and Steel Buildings has undertaken various projects across numerous industries. Some of these construction projects include:
 QICC cable factory in Doha
 Lulu Hypermarket in Dibba
 Oryx Metal industries in Oman
 Cooling plant for Dubai Metro
 TAKREER research center in Abu Dhabi
 Cast house and offices for EMAL
 Solar field assembly for Shams solar power station
 Emirates SkyCargo Terminal
 Phase 1 of the Dubai Design District (D3)
 IKEA Distribution Center - Dubai
 Nestle Dubai Manufacturing
 Inbound Warehouse for Almarai in Al Kharj
 Fruit Cold Store for Del Monte Foods in Khorma
 Warehouse and Offices for RSA Logistics in Dubai Logistics City
 US$160m Food Plant for BRF S.A. in Abu Dhabi
 Presidential Flights Hangar 2 at Abu Dhabi International Airport
 ADNOC Accommodations in Ruwais by DuBox
 RSA Cold Chain Facility in Dubai South
 Light Industrial Units for Jebel Ali Free Zone Authority

Awards 

In 2009, Amana Contracting and Steel Buildings was awarded the Dubai Quality Appreciation Program certificate for the construction field.
In 2014, the company was awarded the CSR Label by The Dubai Chamber of Commerce and Industry.

References 

Construction and civil engineering companies of the United Arab Emirates
Construction and civil engineering companies established in 1993
Emirati companies established in 1993